The New Zealand royal honours system, a system of orders, decorations and medals, recognises achievements of, or service by, New Zealanders or others in connection with New Zealand. Until 1975, New Zealand used the British honours system.

The monarch of New Zealand awards honours on ministerial advice. However, certain awards remain in the exclusive gift of the monarch.

The Honours Unit of the Department of the Prime Minister and Cabinet administers the New Zealand honours system.

History

Since the beginning of settlement in the mid-nineteenth century, British honours were awarded in New Zealand. In 1848, Governor George Grey received the first honour granted to a New Zealand resident, becoming a Knight Commander of the Order of the Bath. For more than a hundred years the British honours system was used for New Zealand. In appropriate cases, this included peerages and baronetcies.

Bernard Freyberg, although not born in New Zealand and resident outside New Zealand for a considerable portion of his life, had significant connections with New Zealand, and was ennobled while serving as governor-general of New Zealand in 1951. The current bearer of the title, Valerian Freyberg, 3rd Baron Freyberg, is based in the United Kingdom and is one of the 92 hereditary peers elected to sit in the House of Lords.

Arthur Porritt, a New Zealand-born physician, surgeon, statesman and athlete, became a baronet in 1963 and was appointed governor-general of New Zealand in 1967 (the first person born in New Zealand to serve in this post), serving until 1972. He moved to live in England upon the expiry of his term as governor-general, and was later ennobled in 1973. Porritt was resident in England at the time he was made a baronet and at the time he received his peerage. His son, Jonathon Porritt, is resident in England and is entitled to register his claim to his father's baronetcy (but not to his peerage, since it was a life peerage). He has so far declined to do so.

In 1975, after a review of the system, two uniquely New Zealand honours were integrated into it: the Queen's Service Order, and its affiliated Medal. In 1987, the Order of New Zealand was instituted as the supreme New Zealand honour.

In 1996, Robin Cooke, a New Zealand judge, was awarded a life peerage. Following his ennoblement until his retirement at the age of 75, Cooke sat in the British House of Lords as a law lord, and ex officio also in the Judicial Committee of the Privy Council, which at that time was the highest authority in the New Zealand judicial system. Cooke is the only Commonwealth judge from outside Britain to have attained this distinction (James Atkin was born in Australia but only spent the first three years of his life there before returning permanently to England and Wales). The discontinuance of appeals to the Privy Council from New Zealand in 2003 (combined with the cessation of the judicial functions of the House of Lords since then) makes it unlikely that a similar honour will be granted in future on the strength of judicial services rendered in New Zealand.

A further review of the New Zealand Honours system in 1996 and 1997 resulted in the termination of awards of almost all British honours and the creation of a new five-level New Zealand Order of Merit to replace them.  In 2000, Prime Minister Helen Clark announced that no further awards of knighthoods and damehoods would be made in the New Zealand Honours system.

In March 2009, Prime Minister John Key announced the restoration of knighthoods and damehoods to the New Zealand Honours system, with past recipients of the two highest grades of the New Zealand Order of Merit to be eligible to receive titles.

Orders and other honours

 Orders. The Order of the Garter is the country's highest civilian honour, then the Order of the Thistle, then the Order of Merit, then the Order of New Zealand, then the New Zealand Order of Merit (with five levels), then the Royal Victorian Order. The Queen's Service Order has similar precedence to the fourth level of the NZ Order of Merit. The Queen's Service Medal takes precedence after the NZ Order of Merit. Prior to the reorganisation of the New Zealand honours system in 1996, New Zealanders received various British Imperial honours, namely peerages and baronetcies of the United Kingdom, the Order of the Bath, Order of St Michael and St George, Order of the British Empire, and Knight Bachelor.
 Other decorations and medals. These usually do not carry titles, but nonetheless entitle the holder to place post nominals after their name. The New Zealand Antarctic Medal and the Distinguished Service Decoration are analogues to the Polar Medal and the Medal of the Order of the British Empire. (See British and Commonwealth orders and decorations)
 The Most Venerable Order of St John of Jerusalem (founded 1888). Although it is an independent order of chivalry, it is officially sanctioned by virtue of the fact that the monarch is the Sovereign of the Order. The Governor-General of New Zealand is the Prior in New Zealand. The members of this semi-official order can wear the Order's insignia, but do not receive any titles of Knighthood or use any post-nominal letters.
 Honours in the exclusive gift of the monarch such as the Order of the Garter, Order of the Thistle, Royal Victorian Order and Order of Merit are not conferred on ministerial advice and continue to be part of the New Zealand royal honours system.

See also

 British and Commonwealth orders and decorations
 New Zealand Honours Order of Precedence
 New Zealand gallantry awards
 New Zealand bravery awards
 New Zealand campaign medals
 New Zealand Meritorious & Long Service Awards
 Orders, decorations, and medals of the United Kingdom
 State decoration
 2009 Special Honours
 Living New Zealand dames and knights

References

External links
 The Cabinet Office Honours Unit
 NZ Defence Force

Honours systems
New Zealand and the Commonwealth of Nations
Honours